was the 12th of 24 s, built for the Imperial Japanese Navy following World War I. When introduced into service, these ships were the most powerful destroyers in the world. They served as first-line destroyers through the 1930s, and remained formidable weapons systems well into the Pacific War.

History
Construction of the advanced Fubuki-class destroyers was authorized as part of the Imperial Japanese Navy's expansion program from fiscal 1923, intended to give Japan a qualitative edge with the world's most modern ships. The Fubuki class had performance that was a quantum leap over previous destroyer designs, so much so that they were designated . The large size, powerful engines, high speed, large radius of action and unprecedented armament gave these destroyers the firepower similar to many light cruisers in other navies. Shikinami, built at the Maizuru Naval Arsenal was the second in an improved series, which incorporated a modified gun turret which could elevate her main battery of Type 3 127 mm 50 caliber naval guns to 75° as opposed to the original 40°, thus permitting the guns to be used as dual purpose guns against aircraft. Shikinami was laid down on 6 July 1928, launched on 22 June 1929 and commissioned on 24 December 1929. Originally assigned hull designation “Destroyer No. 46”, she was completed as Shikinami.

The 4th Fleet Incident occurred only a year after her commissioning, and Shikinami was quickly taken back to the shipyards to have her hull strengthened.

Operational history
During the Second Sino-Japanese War in 1937, Shikinami covered landing of Japanese forces in Shanghai and Hangzhou. From 1940 on, she was assigned to patrol and cover landings of Japanese forces in south China.

World War II history
At the time of the attack on Pearl Harbor, Shikinami was assigned to Destroyer Division 19 of DesRon 3 of the IJN 1st Fleet, and had deployed from Kure Naval District to the port of Samah on Hainan Island, escorting Japanese troopships for landing operations in the Battle of Malaya at the end of 1941.

In January–February 1942, Shikinami was assigned to the escort of the aircraft carrier  as it conducted air strikes in the Java Sea.  During the Battle of Sunda Strait on 1 March, Shikinami entered the battle late, but contributed by firing the final torpedo, which sank the United States Navy heavy cruiser . She escorted troopship convoys from Saigon to Rangoon through the remainder of March. From 13–22 April, she returned via Singapore and Camranh Bay to Kure Naval Arsenal, for maintenance.

On 4–5 June, Shikinami participated in the Battle of Midway as part of Admiral Isoroku Yamamoto’s main fleet. Shikinami sailed from Amami-Ōshima to Mako Guard District, Singapore, Sabang and Mergui for a projected second Indian Ocean raid. The operation was cancelled due to the Guadalcanal campaign, and Shikinami was ordered to Truk instead, arriving in late August. During the Battle of the Eastern Solomons on 24 August, Shikinami escorted the fleet supply group to Guadalcanal. She was assigned to numerous "Tokyo Express" transport missions to various locations in the Solomon Islands in October and November.

During the Second Naval Battle of Guadalcanal on 14–15 November 1942  Shikinami was attached to a scouting force under the command of Rear Admiral Shintarō Hashimoto in the light cruiser . Shikinami survived the battle without damage, and returned to Kure by the end of the year.

In January 1943, Shikinami escorted a troop convoy from Pusan to Palau and on to Wewak. For the remainder of January–February, she patrolled out of Truk or Rabaul. On 25 February, Shikinami was reassigned to the IJN 8th Fleet.

During the Battle of the Bismarck Sea on 1–4 March, Shikinami escorted a troop convoy from Rabaul to Lae. She survived the Allied air attack on 3 March which sank her sister ship , and rescued Rear Admiral Masatomi Kimura and other survivors. After returning to Kure briefly in March, Shikinami continued to serve in an escort and transport role in the Solomon Islands and New Guinea area through the end of October 1943.  At the end of October 1943, Shikinami was refit in Singapore, and assigned to escort of transports between Singapore and Surabaya and Balikpapan for the remainder of the year.

In a month-long refit in Singapore from mid-March-mid-April, additional anti-aircraft guns were fitted. In May–June, Shikinami made numerous escort missions between Singapore, the Philippines and Palau. During a troop transport mission to Biak as flagship for Admiral Naomasa Sakonju, Shikinami came under a strafing air attack, which set fire to her depth charges, which were jettisoned just before they exploded, killing two crewmen and wounding four others. Shikinami continued to escort ships between Singapore, Brunei and the Philippines from June–August, rescuing the survivors of the torpedoed Ōi on 19 July. Eight officers and 120 men rescued by the destroyer , but her captain — Lieutenant Commander Takahashi — and Rear Admiral Sadamichi Kajioka were killed in action.

On 10 October 1944, Shikinami was removed from the navy list.

Notes

References

External links

Muir, Dan Order of Battle - The Battle of the Sunda Strait 1942

Fubuki-class destroyers
Ships built by Maizuru Naval Arsenal
1929 ships
Second Sino-Japanese War naval ships of Japan
World War II destroyers of Japan
Ships sunk by American submarines
World War II shipwrecks in the South China Sea
Maritime incidents in September 1944